Koikimo, short for , is a Japanese romantic comedy illustration collection by Mogusu. It was first uploaded on Pixiv until it got an online manga serialization on Ichijinsha's Comic POOL digital manga magazine in January 2015. Eight tankōbon volumes were released between January 2015 and March 2021. An anime television series adaptation by Nomad premiered on March 29, 2021, on streaming platforms and on television from April 5 to June 21, 2021.

Characters

A 17 year old high school student who, after saving Ryo from falling down the stairs and giving him her lunch, ends up receiving Ryo's enthusiastic approaches. Her name means "one flower" and probably because of this, Ryo sends her one flower a day to her house as a way to prove his feelings. While rejecting Ryo everytime he approaches her, Ichika doesn't seem to mind Ryo's presence.

A 27 year old womanizer salaryman who falls in love with Ichika after receiving a cold reply from her when offering his own body as gratitude for saving him.

Ryo's younger sister and Ichika's best friend at school who is supportive of her brother's feelings.

Ichika's classmate who develops feelings for her.

 Ryo's colleague at work who has feelings for him.

 Ryo's friend since middle school and a freelance cameraman.

Media

Manga
The series is written and illustrated by Mogusu. It was first uploaded on Pixiv until it got an online manga serialization on Ichijinsha's Comic POOL digital manga magazine in January 2015. Eight tankōbon volumes were released between January 2015 and March 2021.

Anime
An anime television series adaptation was announced by Ichijinsha on January 21, 2020. The series is animated by Nomad and directed by Naomi Nakayama, with Taku Yamada serving as assistant director. Yūko Kakihara will oversee scripts, Mariko Fujita will design characters and serve as chief animation director, and Hiroaki Tsutsumi will compose the music. The series aired from April 5 to June 21, 2021, on AT-X, Tokyo MX, UHB, MRT, GTV, GYT, and BS Fuji. The series  premiered on March 29, 2021, on streaming platforms. Ace Collection performed the series' opening theme song "Monoqlo City", while MaRuRi to Ryuga performed the series' ending theme song "Linaria". Crunchyroll licensed the series outside of Southeast Asia.

Episode list

Notes

References

External links
  
  
 

2021 anime television series debuts
Anime series based on manga
AT-X (TV network) original programming
Crunchyroll anime
Ichijinsha manga
Japanese webcomics
Josei manga
Nomad (company)
Romantic comedy anime and manga
Webcomics in print